Lygrocharis is a genus of beetles in the family Cerambycidae, containing the following species:

 Lygrocharis neivai Melzer, 1927
 Lygrocharis nigripennis Mendes, 1938

References

Rhinotragini